Jacques Lob (19 August 1932 – 24 May 1990) was a French comic book creator, known for several comics creations, including Superdupont.

Biography
Jacques Lob began his career as an illustrator of humorous cartoons that were published in various magazines, until he was advised to focus on his writing by Jean-Michel Charlier. Working for magazines like Pilote, Spirou, and Record in the early 1960s, he wrote material for artists such as Jean-Claude Mézières, Pierre Guilmard, Jo-El Azara and eventually Jijé providing material for Jerry Spring.

Upon meeting Georges Pichard, the two began a partnership that would span several works and a few genres. Initially they produced Ténébrax in 1964, for the short-lived magazine Chouchou; its serialisation continued in the Italian magazine Linus. For Pilote, they produced the family-friendly superhero parody, Submerman. The following series Blanche Épiphanie, serialised in V Magazine in 1968, was of a different character however, and its erotic qualities caused mixed public reaction. In this genre, they also produced Ulysse for Charlie Mensuel in 1969.

In collaboration with Gotlib, in 1972 he created his most famous character, Superdupont. It was first serialised in Pilote, and later in L'Écho des savanes, then drawn by Alexis, and after his death, by Solé.

His 1982 work Le Transperceneige (Snowpiercer) drawn by Jean-Marc Rochette, was later used as the basis for the works The Explorers (1999) and The Crossing (2000) with Rochette continuing his work, and Benjamin Legrand, editor of the original, contributing the writing. In 2013 the film Snowpiercer was adapted from the work. These works were translated to English in Titan Comics in 2014 under the names Snowpiercer: The Escape and Snowpiercer: The Explorers.

In 1986, he wrote "Intérieur Noir" for Edmond Baudoin in À Suivre and "Arlette et Charley" for Dan in Okapi, and in 1988 he teamed up with Baudoin again to start the series about the female cab driver "Carla".

Partial bibliography

Sources

 Jacques Lob publications in Pilote and Fluide Glacial – BDoubliées 
 Jacques Lob albums – Bedetheque 

Footnotes

External links
 Jacques Lob biography on Lambiek Comiclopedia

1932 births
1990 deaths
French comics writers
French comics artists
French satirists
French parodists
Writers from Paris
Grand Prix de la ville d'Angoulême winners
French male writers
French graphic novelists
20th-century French male writers